RNF may refer to:

Aircraft Accident Investigation Board (Iceland) (Rannsóknarnefnd flugslysa)
Ring-sum normal form, in Boolean algebra
Rassemblement National Français ('French National Rally'), a French political party 1954–1957